Dogura is a mission station in Milne Bay Province, in the south-east of Papua New Guinea. It is located on the northern shore of Milne Bay. The town is located within Alotau Urban LLG.

Its Cathedral of Ss Peter & Paul is the episcopal see of the Diocese of Dogura, in the Anglican Church of Papua New Guinea. The cathedral was consecrated in 1939, and, at the time, was the largest building in the then Territory of Papua and Territory of New Guinea. The mission station complex also includes a hospital (St Barnabas's).

Climate
Dogura has a tropical rainforest climate (Af) with heavy rainfall year-round.

References 

Populated places in Milne Bay Province